There are about 2,235 known moth species in Iran. Moths (mostly nocturnal) and butterflies (mostly diurnal) together make up the taxonomic order Lepidoptera.

This is a list of moth species which have been recorded in Iran.

Brahmaeidae
Brahmaea christophi
Brahmaea wallichii

Bombycidae
Bombyx mori
Trilocha varians
Penicillifera apicalis
Gunda ochracea
Gunda javanica
Epia capsivora

Lasiocampidae
Malacosoma castrensis
Malacosoma neustria
Malacosoma parallela
Eriogaster lanestris
Eriogaster amygdali
Eriogaster philipsi
Eriogaster acanthophylli
Eriogaster neogena
Lasiocampa eversmanni
Lasiocampa bufo
Lasiocampa trifolii
Lasiocampa quercus
Lasiocampa terreni
Lasiocampa grandis
Lasiocampa piontkovskii
Chondrostega aurivillii
Chondrostega hyrcana
Chilena cuneata
Chilena sordida
Chilena laristana
Chilena prixina
Sena proxima
Epicnaptera albofasciata
Pachypasa otus
Taragama repanda
Taragama siva
Taragama amygdali
Phyllodesma tremulifolia
Phyllodesma glasunovi
Phyllodesma farahae
Trichiura mirzayani
Trichiura pistaciae

Saturnidae
Neoris huttoni
Saturnia pyri
Aglia tau
Eudia pavonia
Actias selene
Actias maenas
Attacus atlas
Archaeoattacus edwardsii
Samia cynthia
Antheraea helferi
Caligula anna
Loepa katinka

Lemoniidae
Lemonia peilei
Lemonia pia

Sphingidae
Theretra alecto
Theretra boisduvalii
Acherontia atropos
Acherontia styx
Hyles hippophaes
Hyles centralasiae
Hyles euphorbiae
Hyles livornica
Hyles nicaea
Hyles zygophylli
Rethera brandti
Rethera komarovi
Hippotion celerio
Agrius convolvuli
Hemaris croatica
Hemaris tityus
Hemaris fuciformis
Akbesia davidi
Kentrochrysalis elegans
Deilephila elpenor
Deilephila porcellus
Smerinthus kindermanni
Smerinthus ocellatus
Clarina kotschyi
Daphnis nerii
Laothoe populi populeti
Proserpinus proserpina
Marumba quercus
Macroglossum stellatarum
Mimas tiliae
Sphinx pinastri
Sphingonaepiopsis gorgoniades
Acosmeryx anceus
Acosmeryx naga
Acosmeryx sericeus
Ampelophaga rubiginosa
Apocalypsis velox
Theretra castanea
Theretra clotho

Arctiidae
Eilema pseudocomplanum
Eilema pygmaeolum
Utetheisa pulchella
Utetheisa lotrix
Arctia villica
Arctia caja
Arctia festiva
Volgarctia spectabilis
Chelis maculosa
Chelis reticulata
Lithosia quadra
Manulea palliatella hyrcana
Lithosia pseudocomplana
Argina cribraria
Ocnogyna loewii loewii
Ocnogyna loewii armena
Euprepia rivularis
Diacrisia urticae
Axiopoena maura
Lacydes semiramis
Rhyparia purpurata
Phragmatobia fuliginosa
Phragmatobia placida
Callimorpha dominula
Callimorpha quadripunctaria
Euplagia splendidior
Meganola venusta
Meganola strigula
Nola chlamitulalis
Nola squalida
Nola haronni
Nola turanica
Paidia conjuncta
Creatonotos gangis
Parasemia plantaginis
Pelosia muscerda
Pelosia obtusa
Amata hyrcana
Amata nigricornis
Amata phegea
Arctia flavia
Argina astraea
Axiopoena fluviatilis
Chelis reticulata
Creataloum arabicum
Creatonotos arabica
Creatonotos gracilis
Creatonotos omanirana
Cymbalophora rivularis
Diacrisia sannio
Dysauxes famula
Dysauxes parvigutta
Dysauxes punctata
Ebertarctia nordstroemi
Eilema arideola
Eilema arundineola
Eilema aurantia
Eilema aureola
Eilema banghaasi
Eilema beckeri
Eilema flaveola
Eilema gilveola
Eilema grisea
Eilema hyrcana
Eilema iberica
Eilema marcida
Eilema obscura
Eilema orientalis
Eilema palleola
Eilema palliatella
Eilema peluri
Eilema petreola
Eilema saerdabensis
Eilema sericeoalba
Eilema sericeola
Eilema sordidula
Eilema sororculum
Eilema unita
Eilema vitellina
Empusa fasciata
Empusa hedenborgii
Empusa pauperata
Empusa pennicornis
Euplagia quadripunctaria
Manulea pseudocomplana
Manulea pygmaeola
Manulea unita
Nebrarctia semiramis
Neeressa palawanensis
Paidia elegantia
Syntomis persica
Utetheisa callima
Watsonarctia casta
Wittia sororcula

Lymantriidae
Orgyia dubia
Orgyia gonostigma
Orgyia recens
Dicallomera fascelina
Euproctis similis
Euproctis phaeorrhaea
Euproctis cervina
Euproctis chrysorrhoea
Euproctis karghalica
Porthesia melania
Arctornis chrysorrhaea
Lymantria dispar
Lymantria amabilis
Lymantria destitute
Lymantria lapidicola
Lymantria komarovi
Laelia richteri
Leucoma salicis
Leucoma wiltshirei
Ocneria signatoria
Ocneria insolita
Ocneria iranica
Ocneria audeoudi
Ocnerogyia amanda
Casama vilis
Casama innotata
Ocnerogyia terebynthina
Ocnerogyia signatoria
Subacronicta centralis

Noctuidae

Condicinae
Hadjina lutosa subflava Hacker and Ebert, 2002
Cryphia eucta Hampson, 1908
Cryphia argentacea Bytinski-Salz & Brandt, 1937
Cryphia eucharista Boursin, 1960
Cryphia salomonis Boursin, 1954
Cryphia klapperichi Boursin, 1960
Victrix sassanica Wiltshire, 1961
Victrix macrosema Boursin, 1957
Dysmilichia mira Brandt, 1938
Dysmilichia phaulopsis Brandt, 1938
Dysmilichia erastrioides Brandt, 1938
Dysmilichia gigantea Brandt, 1941
Stenodrina agramma Brandt, 1938
Caradrina panurgia Boursin, 1939

Herminiinae
Polypogon lunalis
Herminia proxima

Raphiinae
Raphia cheituna

Rivulinae
Colobochyla salicalis
Raparna amseli
Raparna erubescens
Raparna conicephala

Hypeninae
Rhynchodontodes revolutalis
Rhynchodontodes orientis
Rhynchodontodes ravalis
Rhynchodontodes ravulalis
Hypena munitalis
Hypena indicatalis
Hypena abyssinalis
Hypena extensalis
Hypena obsitalis
Hyrcanypena schwingenschussi
Mekrania punctalis

Scoliopteryginae
Scolipteryx libatrix

Catocalinae
Mormonia mesopotamica
Catocala lesbia
Catocala abacta
Catocala neonympha
Catocala fraxini
Catocala electa
Catocala puerpera
Catocala elocata
Catocala nymphagoga
Catocala promissa
Catocala optima
Catocala deducta
Catocala lupina
Catocala fredi
Ephesia luscinia
Ephesia nymphae
Minucia bimaculata
Minucia lunaris
Pericyma squalens
Pericyma albidentaria
Pericyma signata
Pericyma glaucinans
Lygephila craccae
Heteropalpia vetusta
Drasteria sinuosa
Drasteria flexuosa
Drasteria picta
Drasteria cailino
Drasteria yerburyi
Prodotis stolida
Aleucanitis caucasica
Plecoptera reflexa
Anumeta arenosa
Anumeta atrosignata
Tarachephia hueberti
Ophiusa pancerorum
Ophiusa tirhaca
Aedia funesta
Acantholipes regularis
Acantholipes circumdata
Acantholipes affinis
Grammodes bifasciana
Grammodes geometrica
Grammodes paerambar
Dysgonia algira
Dysgonia torrida
Dysgonia latifascia
Clytie syriaca
Clytie delunaris
Clytie benenotata
Clytie devia
Clytie terrulenta
Clytie iranica
Clytie distincta
Gonospileia munita
Chalciope hyppasia
Pandesma anysa
Apopestes spectrum
Autophila asiatica
Autophila cerealis
Autophila luxuriosa
Autophila osthelderi
Autophila ligaminosa
Autophila limbata
Autophila bang-haasi
Autophila depressa
Autophila libanotica perornata
Autophila subfusca
Autophila gracilis
Autophila hirstua
Catephia alchymista
Marsipiophora christophi
Tyta luctuosa
Cortyta dispar
Cortyta impar
Gnamptonyx vilis
Epharmottomena tenera
Epharmottomena leucodonta
Iranada turcorum
Acrobyla kneuckeri
Acrobyla ariefera
Armada maritima
Armada leprosa
Armada leuconephra
Armada tarachoides
Armada ornata
Armada mira
Armada panaceorum
Armada roseifemur
Armada hueberi
Armada draudti
Armada venusta
Armada funesta
Armada gelida
Armada dentata
Thira robusta
Tathorhynchus exsiccata
Anydrophila bang-hassi
Anydrophila distincta
Anydrophila horhammeri
Anydrophila sirdar
Toxocampa lubrica
Zethes narghisa
Zethes nemea
Cerocala sana
Leucanitis kabylaria
Anophia cana
Calpe nubifera
Calpe dubiosa
Africalpe vagabunda
Syndea pica
Syndea saisani
Metopistis picturata
Procus koutchilou
Spintherops cerealis

Nolinae
Nola aerugula

Sarrothripinae
Nycteola asiatica
Characoma nilotica
Sarrothripus revayana
Bryophilopsis roederi
Selepa docilis

Chloephorinae
Earias chlorana
Earias insulana
Bena bicolorana
Paradoxia graellsi
Hylophilina bichlorana
Earias chlorophyllana

Acronictinae
Acronicta psi
Acronicta eleagni
Subacronicta centralis
Acronicta saadi
Acronicta taurica
Acronycta rumicis
Simyra albovenusa
Simyra dentinosa
Simyra nervosa
Apatele aceris
Craniophora pontica

Cyrphiinae
Bryophila maeonis
Bryophila iranica
Bryophila divisa
Bryophila receptricula
Bryophila tabora
Bryophila centralis
Bryophila taftana
Bryophila forsteri
Bryophila muralis
Bryophila argentacea

Euteliinae
Eutelia adulatrix
Eutelia adoratrix

Plusiinae
Abrostola tripartia
Abrostola asclepiadis clarissa
Plusia chrysitis
Plusia gutta
Plusia festucae
Autographa gamma
Cornutiplusia circumflexa
Trichoplusia ni
Chrysodeixis chalcites
Chrysodeixis eriosoma
Phytometra confuse
Phytometra bella
Phytometra consona
Panchrysia deaurata
Archanara algae

Acontiinae
Eulocastra diaphora
Eulocastra schah
Eulocastra bryophiliodes
Eulocastra mediana
Eulocastra tamsi
Naranga aenescens
Eublemma pallidula
Eublemma pussila
Eublemma amoena
Eublemma albida
Eublemma ostrina
Eublemma parva
Eublemma leucota
Eublemma parvoides
Eublemma apicipuncta
Phyllophila obliterata
Prottodeltote pyrarga
Emmelia trabealis
Prodenia litura
Acontia urania
Acontia lucida
Porphyrinia conistrota
Porphyrinia suppuncta
Porphyrinia chlorotica
Porphyrinia skafiota
Porphyrinia wagneri
Porphyrinia candidana
Porphyrinia pannonica
Porphyrinia caelestis
Porphyrinia rosea sinuata
Porphyrinia drauti
Porphyrinia nives
Porphyrinia cochylioides
Porphyrinia polygramma
Porphyrinia pseudepistrota
Porphyrinia aftob
Porphyrinia compuncta
Porphyrinia munda
Porphyrinia jocularis
Porphyrinia agnella
Porphyrinia illota
Porphyrinia uniformis
Porphyrinia taftana
Porphyrinia pseudoviridis
Porphyrinia bifasciata
Porphyrinia microptera
Porphyrinia murati
Porphyrinia angella
Porphyrinia parvoides
Porphyrinia apicipunctalis
Porphyrinia boursini
Odice arcuinna
Ozabra sancta
Pseudoozarba mesozona
Thalerastrina tansina
Amyna punctum
Leptosia velox rubescens
Leptosia sefidi
Glaphyra lacernaria
Glaphyra communimacula
Tephrochares inquinata
Chionoxantha margarita
Tarache luctuosa
Tarache audeoudi
Tarache umbrifera
Tarache opalinoides
Tarache biskrensis
Hoplotarache sordescens
Hoplotarache costalis
Fredina esmeralda

Cuculliinae
Cucullia maracandica
Cucullia boryphora
Cucullia argentina
Cucullia santonici
Cucullia hemidiaphana
Cucullia tecca
Cucullia anceps
Cucullia tanaceti
Cucullia khorassana
Shargacucullia scrophularia
Shragacucullia barthae
Shragacucullia verbasci
Shragacucullia lychnitis
Pseudocopicucullia syrtana
Metopoceras omar
Metopoceras beata
Metalopha liturata
Cleophana charbordis
Cleophana baetica
Omphalophana anatolica
Calophasia casta
Oncocnemis mongolica iranica
Oncocnemis erythropsis
Oncocnemis indioglypha
Oncocnemis strioligera
Callierges ramosa

Psaphidinae
Brachionycha atossa

Stiriinae
Athetmia pallida
Synthymia solituda
Synthymia dubiosa
Paraegle ochracea
Aegle iranica
Aegle mimetes

Heliothinae
Heliothis maritima Graslin, 1855
Heliothis nubigera Herrich-Schäffer, 1851
Heliothis peltigera ([Denis & Schiffermüller], 1775)
Heliothis incarnata Freyer, 1838
Helicoverpa armigera (Hübner, [1808])
Schinia scutosa ([Denis & Schiffermüller], 1775)
Periphanes delphinii (Linnaeus, 1758)
Periphanes treitschkei (Frivaldsky, 1835)
Periphanes victorina (Sodoffsky, 1849)
Pyrrhia umbra (Hufnagel, 1766)
Aedophron phlebophora Lederer, 1858
Aedophron venosa Christoph, 1887
Aedophron rhodites (Eversmann, 1851)
Aedophron sumorita Ronkay, 2002
Heliocheilus confertissima (Walker, 1865)
Masalia albida (Hampson, 1905)
Masalia philbyi (Brandt, 1941)
Masalia perstriata fuscostriata (Brandt, 1941)

Agaristinae
Thiacidas postica

Amphipyrinae
Amphipyra pyramidea
Amphipyra tragopoginis
Amphipyra tetra pallida
Amphipyra molybdea
Elaphria venustula
Elaphria zobeidah
Elaphria xanthorhoda
Elaphria eremocosma
Elaphria bodenheimeri
Elaphria hemipentha
Elaphria brandti
Elaphria panurgia
Elaphria pulvis
Elaphria pseudadelpha
Elaphria rajobovi pseudovicina
Elaphria stenoptera
Elaphria poecila
Elaphria phanosciera
Elaphria didyma
Elaphria wiltshirei
Elaphria salzi
Elaphria parvaspersa
Elaphria vicina
Elaphria atriluna
Elaphria scotoptera
Elaphria sarhadica
Elaphria albina
Elaphria albersi
Elaphria assymetrica
Elaphria khorassana
Elaphria inumbrata
Elaphria fergana
Elaphira pseudalbina
Elaphira soudanensis
Elaphira diabolica
Elaphira flava
Elaphira alfierii
Elaphria forsteri
Elaphria rufirena
Elaphria clara armeniaca
Ulochlaena hirta
Mormo maura
Phlogophora meticulosa
Dypterygia scabriuscula
Paradrina clavipalpis
Nonagria typhae
Seasamia cretica
Eremodrina pertinax
Meganephria renalis
Meganephria crassicornis
Amathes oropotamica
Amathes macilenta
Amathes lychnidis
Amathes modesta
Polymixis bischoffi
Polymixis trisignata
Aporophyla australis
Xylina exsoleta
Lithophane lapidea
Lithophane semibrunnea
Dryobotodes eremita
Antitype serpentina
Antitype carducha
Antitype chosroes
Antitype dubiosa
Xantia ocellaris
Cosmia trapezina
Margelana achaemenica
Margelana flavidior
Margelana versicolor
Margelana veternosa
Stilbina hypaenides
Arenostola sohnretheli
Sidemia apothenia
Parastichtis ypsillon
Parastichtis mongolypha
Parastichtis polyglypha
Parastichtis leucodon
Parastichtis secalis
Parastichtis oblonga
Metapoplus boursini
Megalodes tengistana
Megalodes tengistanica
Ammoconia caecimacula
Orthosia incerta
Cloantha hyperici
Spodoptera exigua
Spodoptera littoralis
Spodoptera mauritia
Spodoptera cilium
Cardarina quadripunctata
Caradrina oberthuri
Dicycla oo
Perigea illecta
Hadjina viscosa
Hadjina lutosa
Hadjina palaestinensis
Dysmilichia phaulopsis
Dysmilichia erastrioides
Dysmilichia gigantea
Dysmilichia bicolor
Dysmilichia bicyclica
Auchmis comma
Oligia literosa
Eremobia ochroleuca
Crymodes platinea aurora
Scythocentropus cyrus
Boursinia oxygramma
Boursinia symmicta
Pseudohadena chenopodiphaga
Pseudohadena schlumbergeri
Pseudohadena sengana
Pseudohadena siri roseotincta
Pseudohadena banghaasi
Eriopus latereillei
Eriopus purpureoffasciata
Polyphaenis monophaenis
Stenodrina agramma
Hoplodrina ambigua
Pseudathetis fixseni
Haemassia renalis
Maraschia grisescens
Enargia badiofasciata
Oria musculosa
Calamia virens immaculata
Eumichtis muscosa
Bryomima johanna
Sidema hedygramma
Sidema gracilis
Sidema apotheina
Sidema discalis
Heterographa tetrastigma
Heterographa pungeleri
Scythocentropus inquinata
Catamecia jordana
Catamecia ferdovsi
Arenostola phragmitidis

Hadeninae
Discestra trifolii
Discestra sociabilis
Leucania vitellina
Leucania obsoleta
Mythimna l-album
Hecatera dysodea
Lacanobia w-latinum
Lacanobia thalassina
Egira conspicillaris
Hadena laudeti
Hadena reticulata
Monima mithras
Mythimna unipuncta
Mythimna albipuncta
Mythimna zeae
Mythimna loreyi
Mamestra corsica
Trichorhiza peterseni
Polia vidua
Polia cappa
Polia serena
Polia spinaciae
Polia rhodocharis
Harmodia lepida
Harmodia luteocincta
Harmodia melanochroa
Harmodia drauti
Harmodia mesolampra
Harmodia cimelia
Harmodia armeriae
Harmodia magnolii
Harmodia pumila
Harmodia luteago
Harmodia drenowskii
Harmodia montana
Thargelia pusilla
Pronotestra silenides
Epia capsivora
Lasiestra vulpecula
Eriopygodes discalis
Hyphilare lithargyria
Sideridis hispanica
Sideridis punctosa
Sideridis prominens
Sideridis putrescens
Miselia consanguis
Miselia apinaciae
Miselia oleracea

Noctuinae
Standfussiana defessa
Yigoga signifera
Yigoga forcipula
Yigoga gracilis
Yigoga orientis
Yigoga flavina
Axylia putris
Agrotis c-nigrum
Agrotis spinifera
Agrotis sardzeana
Agrotis segetum
Agrotis obesa
Agrotis crassa
Agrotis clavis
Agrotis exclamationis
Agrotis ipsilon
Agrotis segetis
Agrotis puta
Agrotis serraticornis
Agrotis forficula
Agrotis benigna
Agrotis nigrescens
Agrotis amasina
Agrotis wiltshirei
Agrotis iuguma
Agrotis facunda
Agrotis truculenta
Agrotis elbursica
Agrotis pasia
Agrotis squalidior
Agrotis terminicincta
Agrotis psammochroa
Agrotis melanura
Agrotis illauta
Agrotis pfeifferi
Agrotis fredi
Agrotis fimbriola
Agrotis laceta
Agrotis capnistis
Agrotis glebosa
Agrotis juvenis
Agrotis sterilis
Agrotis maraschi
Agrotis semna
Agrotis polygona
Agrotis nili
Agrotis hoggari
Agrotis lupinus
Agrotis senna
Powellinia lasserri
Euxoa hastifera firdusii
Euxoa canariensis
Euxoa basigramma
Euxoa diamondi
Euxoa perierga
Euxoa conspiqua
Euxoa aquilina obeliscata
Euxoa aneucta
Euxoa anaemica
Euxoa heringi
Euxoa clauda
Euxoa dolomedes
Euxoa scurrilis
Euxoa difficillima
Euxoa vanensis
Euxoa inclusa
Euxoa praestigiosa
Euxoa lugubris
Euxoa conspicua
Euxoa fallax
Euxoa cos
Euxoa sigmata
Euxoa mustelina
Euxoa adjemi
Euxoa cognita
Euxoa dsheiron
Euxoa temera
Rhyacia lucipeta
Rhyacia sollers
Rhyacia simulans
Rhyacia insignata
Rhyacia consenscens
Rhyacia damnata
Rhyacia helvetina deliciosa
Rhyacia squalida
Rhyacia demavendi
Rhyacia arenacea
Rhyacia nyctymerina
Rhyacia elegans anatolica
Rhyacia cacumena
Rhyacia sareptana
Rhyacia eminens
Rhyacia latens
Rhyacia lucernea
Rhyacia larixia
Rhyacia alpestris ponticola
Peridroma saucia
Anaplectoides prasina
Triphaena janthina
Dichagyris squalorum
Dichagyris melanura
Dichagyris celebrata
Dichagyris singularis
Dichagyris subsqualorum opulenta
Dichagyris tyrannus
Dichagyris taftana
Dichagyris leucomelas
Dichagyris subsquualorum
Ochropleura flammatra
Ochropleura anastasia
Ochropleura wiltshirei
Xestia xanthographa
Xestia palaestinensis
Noctua orbona
Noctua comes
Noctua pronuba
Eugnorisma semiramis
Eugnorisma miniago
Scotia ipsilon
Chersotis hahni
Chersotis sarhada
Chersotis nitens
Chersotis binaloudi
Ogygia improceranachadira
Ogygia mirabica
Ogygia strenua
Opigenapolygona obscurata
Polytela cliens

Unassigned
Brandtia albonigra
Achaea finita
Achaea lienardi
Acontia imitatrix
Acontia transfigurata
Agoma trimenii
Anomis erosa
Anomis sabulifera
Anticarsia irrorata
Argyrogramma signata
Callopistria maillardi
Ctenoplusia dorfmeisteri
Cyligramma latona
Eublemma anachoresis
Eublemma cochylioides
Grammodes congenita
Mocis frugalis
Mocis mayeri

Syntomidae
Syntomis phegea
Dysauxes hyalina
Syntomis persica
Dysauxes punctata

Notodontidae
Cerura pulcherrina
Cerura turbida
Cerura syra leucotera
Cerura bifida
Dicranura vinula
Hoplitis milhauseri
Sumeria dipotamica
Pyaera pigra
Stauropus fagi
Notodonta grummi
Notodonta ziczac
Notodonta chaonia
Pterostoma palpina
Spatalia argentina
Harpyia persica
Harpyia pulcherriana
Ochrostigma moayerii
Phalera bucephala
Exaereta ulmi

Thaumetopoeidae
Thaumetopoea solitaria

Geometridae

Oenochrominae
Orthostixis cribraria
Myinodes interpunctaria

Geometrinae
Comibaena serrulata
Thetidia smaragdaria
Thetidia fulminaria
Thetidia crucigerata
Phaiogramma etruscaria 
Chlorissa viridata
Chlorissa faustinata
Chlorissa discessa
Chlorissa gelida
Chlorissa asphaleia
Euchloris prasinaria
Euchloris volgaria
Thalera fimbrialis
Pingasa laha
Gnophosema palumba
Gnophosema isometra
Neromia pulvereisparsa
Neromia simplexa
Microloxia herbaria
Microloxia prouti
Microloxia pasargades
Microloxia indecretata
Xenochlorodes albicostaria
Hemithea punctifimbria
Mixocera parvulata
Hemidromodes sabulifera
Aglossochloris recta
Holoterpha diagrapharia
Phorodesma graminaria
Aplasta ononaria

Sterrhinae
Cyclophora punctaria
Cyclophora albiocellaria
Cyclophora ruficiliaria
Cyclophora quercimontaria
Cyclophora linearia
Cosymbia annulata
Cosymbia puppillaria
Cosymbia suppunctaria
Timandra amata
Scopula turbidaria
Scopula beckeraria
Scopula marginepunctata
Scopula ansulata
Scopula flaccidaria
Scopula ornata
Scopula decorata
Scopula immistaria
Scopula submutata
Scopula orientalis
Scopula lactarioides
Scopula distracta
Scopula serena
Scopula caesaria
Scopula ochroleucaria
Scopula adelpharia
Scopula nigropunctata
Scopula subtilata
Scopula iranaria
Scopula minorata
Scopula pulchellata
Idaea moniliata
Idaea antiquaria
Idaea dimidiata
Idaea subsericeata
Idaea trigeminata
Idaea politaria
Idaea degeneraria erschoffi
Idaea degeneraria
Idaea hathor
Idaea illustris
Idaea ossiculata
Idaea ochrata
Idaea flaveolaria
Idaea rusticate
Idaea laevigata
Idaea elongaria
Idaea inquinata
Idaea politata
Idaea camparia
Idaea aversata
Idaea roseofasciata
Idaea lucellata
Idaea textaria
Idaea obsoletaria
Idaea talvei
Idaea emarginata
Idaea deversaria
Sterrha sacraria
Sterrha consanguinaria
Sterrha rufaria
Sterrha proclivata
Sterrha comparia
Sterrha osthelderi
Sterrha sabulosa
Sterrha allongata
Sterrha wiltshirei
Sterrha improbata
Sterrha eremica
Sterrha microptewra
Sterrha mimetes
Sterrha illustris
Sterrha sanctaria
Sterrha persica
Rhodostrophia vibicaria
Rhodostrophia badiaria
Rhodostrophia terrestraria
Rhodostrophia auctata
Rhodostrophia bahara
Rhodostrophia yumulosa
Rhodostrophia nesam
Rhodostrophia cuprinaria
Rhodostrophia nubifera
Rhodostrophia abscisaria
Rhodostrophia furialis
Rhodostrophia abcisaria
Rhodostrophia sieversi
Rhodostrophia praecisaria
Somatina wiltshirei
Glossotrophia asiatica
Glossotrophia semitata
Glossotrophia chalcographata
Glossotrophia origalis
Glossotrophia gracilis
Glossotrophia chalcographata
Glossotrophia benigna
Glossotrophia rufotinctata
Traminda mundissima
Traminda rufistrigata
Pseudosterrha paulula
Zygophyxia conscensa
Zygophyxia relictata
Brachyglossina chaspia
Brachyglossina rowlandi
Brachyglossina sciasmatica
Rhodometra autophilaria
Anisephyra sublutearia
Anisephyra reducta
Problepsis ocellata

Larentiinae
Scolopteryx vicinaria
Aplocera plagiata
Aplocera numidaria
Aplocera opificata
Aplocera mundulata
Triphosa sabaudiata
Triphosa taochata
Rheumaptera certala
Rheumaptera montivagata
Nebula apiciata
Nebula senectaria
Nebula obvallata
Nebula propagata
Eulithis populate
Eulithis testata
Cidaria rectifasciaria
Cidaria chionata
Cidaria fulvata
Cidaria pistascieti
Cidaria miata
Cidaria fuscofasciata
Cidaria obstipata
Cidaria salicata ablutaria
Cidaria reclamata
Cidaria scopulata
Cidaria unicata
Cidaria polygrammata
Cidaria rubidata
Cidaria saidabadi
Cidaria peribleta
Cidaria wiltshirei
Cidaria rhodoides
Cidaria bigeminata
Cidaria longipennis
Cidaria khorassana
Cidaria distinctata
Cataclysme riguata
Catarhoe putridaria
Catarhoe arachne
Catarhoe permixtaria
Protorhoe renodata
Protorhoe crebrolineata
Protorhoe turkmenaria
Perizoma albulatum
Camptogramma bilineatum
Euphyia sintenisi
Euphyia chalusata
Eupithecia laquaearia
Eupithecia quercetia
Eupithecia mirificata
Eupithecia tesserata
Eupithecia husseini
Eupithecia ridiculata
Eupithecia fuscopunctata
Eupithecia irritaria
Eupithecia bastelbergeri
Eupithecia cheituna
Eupithecia sectila
Eupithecia montanata
Eupithecia scalptata
Eupithecia gratiosata
Eupithecia harenosa
Eupithecia sincera
Eupithecia aradjouna
Eupithecia asperata
Eupithecia prouti
Eupithecia costisignata
Eupithecia mohamedana
Eupithecia aequabila
Eupithecia siata
Eupithecia ultimaria
Eupithecia salami
Eupithecia aduncata
Eupithecia tenellata
Eupithecia mekrana
Eupithecia opisthographata
Eupithecia frontosa
Eupithecia innotata
Eupithecia variostrigata
Eupithecia nachadira
Eupithecia keredjana
Eupithecia obtines
Eupithecia mekrana
Eupithecia relaxata
Eupithecia linariata
Eupithecia limbata
Eupithecia decipiens
Eupithecia irriguata
Eupithecia exactata
Eupithecia mesogrammata
Eupithecia extremata
Eupithecia extraversaria
Eupithecia centaureata
Eupithecia accurata
Eupithecia breviculata
Eupithecia vulgata
Eupithecia icterata
Eupithecia impurata
Eupithecia lithographata
Eupithecia sutiliata
Eupithecia distinctaria
Eupithecia pimpinellata
Eupithecia parallelaria
Eupithecia opistographata
Eupithecia inconspicuata
Eupithecia despectaria
Eupithecia terrenata
Eupithecia demetana
Eupithecia gluptata
Eupithecia subpulchrata
Eupithecia conviva
Eupithecia separata
Eupithecia kopetdaghica
Eupithecia ochrovittata
Lythria purpuraria
Lythria rotaria
Lithostege flavicornata
Lithostege buxtoni
Lithostege farinata
Lithostege grisearia
Lithostege amoenata
Lithostege palaestinensis
Lithostege coassata
Lithostege griseata
Minoa murinata
Oulobophora externata
Rhoptia marginata
Scotopteryx elbursica
Orthonama obstipatum
Xanthorhoe fluctuata
Xanthorhoe designata
Xanthorhoe acutangulata
Xanthorhoe ferrugata
Anaitis obsitaria
Gymnoscelis pumilata
Gymnoscelis rufifasciata
Chloroclystis lita palaearctica
Chloroclystis v-ata
Stamnodes depeculata
Phoscotosia antitypa
Philereme senescens
Philereme neglectata
Philereme transversata

Ennominae
Perconia strigillaria
Cabera pusaria
Heterolocha laminaria
Therapis flavicaria
Semiothisa notata
Semiothisa syriacaria
Semiothisa fuscomarginata
Semiothisa rippertaria
Semiothisa signaria
Boarmia gemmaria
Boarmia fredi
Peribatodes umbraria
Peribatodes rhomboidaria
Elophos dilucidaria
Phasinae petraria
Tephrina arenacearia
Tephrina disputaria
Tephrina inconspicuaria
Tephrina perviaria
Tephrina wehrlii
Tephrina sengana
Ennomos quercaria
Ennomos fraxineti
Ennomos fuscantaria
Ennomos olivaria
Ennomos erosaria
Ennomos quercarius
Ennomos quercinarius
Ourapteryx sambucaria
Ourapteryx falciformis
Enanthyperythra legataria
Godonella aestimaria
Biston strataria
Biston betularius
Synopsia sociaria
Gnopharmia objectaria
Gnopharmia irakensis
Gnopharmia kasrunensis
Gnopharmia inermis
Gnopharmia colchidaria
Nychiodes obscuraria
Nychiodes rayatica
Nychiodes variabilis
Nychiodes admirabila
Nychiodes subfusca
Nychiodes subviridia
Nychiodes farinosa
Nychiodes variabila
Nychiodes leviata
Nychiodes agatcha
Nychiodes subvirida
Nychiodes waltheri
Nychiodes antiquaries
Nychiodes amygdalaria
Chiasma calthrata
Epitherina bahmana
Epitherina ghirshmani
Epitherina rhodopolcos
Opisthograptis luteolata
Zamacra flabellaria
Eilicrinia cordiaria
Eilicrinia trinotata
Eilicrinia acardia
Agriopis bajaria
Erannis defoliaria
Erannis ankeraria
Erannis declinans
Gnophos nimbata
Gnophos stevenaria
Gnophos horhammeri
Gnophos sartata
Gnophos gorgata
Gnophos elahi
Gnophos cluminata
Gnophos pollinaria
Gnophos pelengi
Gnophos argillata
Gnophos ali
Gnophos annubilata
Gnophos dubitaria
Gnophos brandtorum
Gnophos stachyphora
Gnophos sibiriata
Gnophos taftana
Gnophos orthogonia
Gnophos anophaea
Gnophos pseudosnelleni
Gnophos subtila
Gnophos eurytiches
Charissa talyshensis
Charissa asymmetra
Charissa onustaria
Charissa adjectaria
Charissa luticiliata
Rhipignophos vastaria
Rhipignophos maledictus
Eubolia murinaria
Eubolia hopfferaria
Colotois pennaria
Dasycorsa modesta
Abraxas wehlri
Stegania dilectaria
Syrrhodia muselmana
Eumera hoferi
Synopsidia phasidaria
Phaselia decliciosaria
Phaselia deliciosaria
Phaselia serrularia
Phaselia narynaria
Phaselia kasyi
Diastictis artesiaria
Enconista tengistanica
Enconista autumnata
Dyscia malatyana
Dyscia sicanaria
Dyscia leucogrammaria
Scodionista amoritaria
Zamarada minimaria
Coenina hyperbolica
Coenina collenettei
Hemerophila brandti
Atomorpha hedemanni
Crocallis mirabica
Crocallis tusciaria
Crocallis elinguaria
Crocallis mirabica
Scodiomima crocallaria
Ectropis crepuscularia
Isturgia disputaria

Drepanidae
Drepana binaria
Cilix glaucata
Cilix asiatica
Cilix depalpata

Thyatiridae
Tethea osthelderi
Tethea ocularis
Tethea caspica
Cymatophora osthelderi

Cimeliidae
Axia theresiae

Zygaenidae
Adscita statices
Jordanita chloros
Procris brandti
Procris persepolis
Procris duskei
Procris sengana
Procris solana
Procris micane
Zygaena pilosellae
Zygaena seitzi
Zygaena rubricollis
Zygaena manlia
Zygaena cacuminum
Zygaena speciosa
Zygaena tamara
Zygaena cuvieri
Zygaena haematina
Zygaena cambysea
Zygaena minos
Zygaena purpuralis
Zygaena rosinae
Zygaena escalerai
Zygaena truchmena
Zygaena chirazica
Zygaena haberhaueri
Zygaena carniolica
Zygaena christa
Zygaena loti
Zygaena ecki
Zygaena viciae
Zygaena dorycnii
Zygaena filipendulae
Zygaena lonicerae

Limacodidae
Parasa inexpectata

Pyralidae

Subfamily unknown
Scotoma shirazalis
Ceutholopha isidis
Amselia heringi

Galleriinae
Galleria mellonella
Achroia grisella
Corcyra cephalonica

Pyralinae
Aglossa pinguinalis
Aglossa aglossalis
Cledeobia bombycalis
Cledeobia consecratalis
Hypotia colchicalis
Pyralis farinalis
Pyralis jungeri
Pyralis comparalis
Pyralis fulvalis
Synaphe punctalis
Actenia persica
Benderia talhouki
Dattinia conformalis
Dattinia rectangula
Dattinia fredi
Dattinia colchicaloides
Dattinia iranalis
Dattinia sardzealis
Dattinia hyrcanalis
Dattinia mimicralis
Dattinia poliopastalis
Constantia brandti
Constantia subargentalis
Constantia indistinctalis
Constantia infascialis
Constantia strictalis
Constantia baloutchistanalis
Constantia argentalis
Bostra bifascialis
Bostra farsalis
Bostra luteocostalis
Bostra pseudospaniella
Bostra comealis
Bostra atomalis
Hypsopygia pfeifferi
Tyndis bilinealis

Epipaschiinae
Lepidogma tamaricalis

Phycitinae
Oncocera semirubella
Eucarphia rippertella
Epischnia cretaciella
Epischnia leucoloma
Epischnia sareptella
Epischnia arabica
Epischnopsis oculatella
Epischnopsis nervocella
Praeepischnia lydella
Praeepischnia taftanella
Praeepischnia irannella
Epiepischnia pseudolydella
Epiepischnia keredjella
Rhodophaea dulcella
Rhodophaea farsella
Rhodophaea iranalis
Rhodophaea senganella
Rhodophaea khachella
Rhodophaea taftanella
Rhodophaea bouchirella
Rhodophaea chirazella
Rhodophaea taftanella
Rhodophaea eburnella
Myelois pallida
Myelois circumvoluta
Myelois flagella
Myelois pumicosa
Myelois cribrella
Myelois cinerea
Myelois lunulella formosella
Spectrobates ceratoniae
Myelois circumdatella
Myelois micropunctella
Myelois britannicella
Myelois constans
Arsissa ramosella
Ancylosis cinnamonella
Ancylosis albicostella
Ancylosis arimanella
Ancylosis cinnamomella persicolella
Ancylosis sefidella
Ancylosis albicostella
Ancylosis ormuzdella
Ancylosis brevipalpella
Ephestia elutella
Ephestia oblitella
Ephestia kuehniella
Ephestia xylobrunnea
Ephestia baptella
Ephestia cautella
Ephestia inductella
Cadra calidella
Cadra cautella
Merulempista cingillella
Nephopterix rhenella
Nephopteryx alpigenella persica
Heterographis hellenica
Heterographis candidatella
Heterographis ephederella
Heterographis costabella
Heterographis concovella
Heterographis subcandidatella
Heterographis deserticola
Euzophera bigella
Euzophera puniciella
Euzophera eburnella
Euzophera formosella orientella
Raphimetopus ablutella
Homoeosoma costabella
Homoeosoma praecalcella
Trissonca muliebris
Trissonca muliebris
Ahwazia albocostalis
Pristophora nigrigranella
Pristophora khorassanella
Pristophora velicella
Pristophora polyptychella
Taftania oxycyma
Nephopteryx macrocirtensis
Nephopteryx rectangulella
Nephopteryx oxybiella
Nephopteryx ardekanella
Nephopteryx cornutella
Nephopteryx macrocirtensis
Nephopteryx minimella
Nephopteryx metamelana
Epiepinia pseudolydella
Shirazia monotona
Arenipes sabella
Hypochalcia rufivinea
Salebria komaroffi
Salebria obductella infernalis
Salebria nigrosquamalis
Salebria pittionii
Salebria mimicralis
Salebria tchabarella
Salebria acrobasella
Salebria noctivaga
Salebria dionysia
Praesalebria geminella
Praesalebria noctivaga
Praesalebria lepidella
Praesalebria argyrophanes
Salebriodes ephestiella
Plodia interpunctella
Melathrix praetextella
Ocrisiodes chirazalis
Phycita mianella
Phycita comeella
Phycita ardekanella
Phycita taftanella
Phycita balutchestanella
Phycita pirizanella
Phycita kurdistanella
Phycita teheranella
Sefidia persica
Parasefidia benderella
Ambesa umbriferella senganella
Hafisia lundbladi
Aproceratia senganella
Mechedia pristophorella
Synoria comeella
Khorassania hartigi
Sclerobiodes persica
Megasis noctileucella
Megasis tolli
Divona mimeticella
Divona parvella
Laristana sardzella
Uncinus hypogryphellus
Sengania ruhmekorfi
Belutchistania squamalis
Paraemporia monotona
Pristocera pallidisignata
Neopempelia hieroglyphella
Pempelia dilutella magna
Pempelia maroccanella
Pempelia ornatella elbursella
Psorosodes dalakiella
Psorosa dahliella
Psorosa maraschella
Psorosa mechedella
Psorosa tochalella
Psorosa elbursella
Epilydia liturosella
Ichorarchis iozona elegiella
Pterothrix fordi
Pterothrixidia osmanella
Pristophorodes khorassanella
Pirizania salebrosella
Ormuzdia cameratella
Oligochroa cineracella
Eurhodope mira
Eurhodope bella
Eurhodope flavella
Acrobasis nigribasalis
Acrobasis nigrisquamella
Ambluncus nervosellus
Saluria maculivitella
Ematheudes vittelinella
Auxacia bilineella
Syria biflexella
Candiope uberalis
Lasiosticha hieroglyphiella
Tlithyia buxtoni
Zophodia suberastriella
Ardekania farsella
Ardekania sefidella
Ardekania albidiscella
Ardekanopsis griseella
Lymira semirosella
Prinanerastia gnathosella
Peoria costella
Peoria ematheudella
Neorastia albicostella
Praerhinaphe monotona
Acritonia comeella

Scopariinae
Scoparia saerdabella
Scoparia bicornutella
Scoparia rupestris
Scoparia ambigualis
Witlesia silacealis

Heliothelinae
Heliothla staudinger

Crambinae
Ancylolomia disparalis
Ancylolomia bitubirosella
Ancylolomia palpella
Ancylolomia micropalpella
Ancylolomia pectinatellus
Ancylolomia benderella
Ancylolomia pectinatella
Ancylolomia affinis
Chilo phragmitellus
Chilo suppressalis
Chilo luteellus
Chiloides hederalis
Thopeutis galleriella
Calamotropha paludella
Metacrambus carectellus
Metacrambus jugaraicae
Metacrambus kurdistanellus
Metacrambus salahinellus
Platytes cerussella
Chrysoteuchia culmella
Xanthocrambus saxonellus
Crambus perlellus
Crambus contaminellus
Crambus pfeifferi
Crambus paludellus
Crambus heringi
Chrysocrambus linetellus
Eromene superbella
Eromene jaxartella
Eromene bahrlutella
Eromene ocellea
Euchromius rayatellus
Euchromius keredjellus
Euchromius malekalis
Euchromius ramburiellus
Euchromius jaxartellus
Euchromius cambridgei
Euchromius pulverosus
Euchromius cochlearellus
Euchromius gratiosellus
Euchromius ocellea
Pediasia persella
Pediasia numidella
Pediasia matricella
Pediasia alcmena
Pediasia pseudopersella
Pediasia contaminella
Pediasia desertella
Lamoria anella
Proceratia caesariella
Talis iranica
Surattha stroblei
Scirpophaga praelata

Schoenobiinae
Schoenobius gigantellus
Schoenobius alpherakii

Cyblomiinae
Cybalomia fractilinealis
Cybalomia pentadalis
Cybalomia triplacogramma
Krombia pulchella
Stiphrometasia sancta
Stiphrometasia monialis
Metasia octogenalis
Metasia virginalis
Metasia subtilialis

Nymphulinae
Nymphula affinialis
Nymphula nymphaeata
Nymphula nigrolinealis sordidior

Odontiinae
Tegostoma baphialis
Tegostoma pentodontalis
Tegostoma uniforma
Tegostoma moeschleri
Tegostoma ahwazalis
Tegostoma paralis
Aechremon disparsalis
Noctuelia floralis
Noctuelia superba
Noctuelia vespertalis
Emprepes patealis
Emprepes chirazica
Emprepes comealis
Emprepes chirazalis
Emprepes palealis
Emprepes russulalis
Titanio hyrcanella
Titanio nissalis
Heliothela flavomarginalis

Evergestinae
Evergestis forficalis
Evergestis frumentalis
Evergestis aenealis dimorphalis
Evergestis affinis
Evergestis paragrummi
Cornifrons ulceratalis

Glaphyriinae
Hellula undalis

Pyraustinae
Prochoristis rupicapralis
Uresiphita polygonalis
Loxotege nudalis
Pyrausta cespitalis
Pyrausta aurata
Pyrausta sanguinalis
Pyrausta trinalis
Pyrausta praepetalis
Pyrausta scutalis
Pyrausta sefidalis
Pyrausta mechedalis
Pyrausta lutulentalis
Apyrausta persicalis
Udea costalis
Endotricha flammealis
Botys dulcinalis
Botys tesserulalis
Botys labutonalis
Anania verbascalis
Ecpyrrhorrhoe rubiginalis
Pleroptya ruralis
Eurycreon klathralis
Sitochroa palealis
Euclasta splendidalis
Euclasta mirabilis
Nomophila noctuella
Psammotis pulveralis
Calaniochrous acutellus
Ostrinia nubilalis
Trigononcus evergestalis
Phlyctaenodes sinuosalis
Phlyctaenodes foviferalis
Prorophora albidogilvella
Synclera interruptalis
Synclera traducalis
Loxostege malekalis
Loxostege farsalis
Loxostege mira
Loxostege ustrinalis
Loxostege palealis anaxisalis
Loxostege sticticalis
Pachyzanchla fascinalis
Pachyzancla licarsicalis
Elbursia stocki
Pionea khorassanalis
Pionea ferrugalis
Trigonuncus nissalis
Trigonuncus euergestalis
Phlyctaenodos platyphaea
Boursinella metasialis
Mukia nigroanalis
Euergestis caesialis
Tchahbaharia dentalis
Ercta ornatalis
Duponchelia fovealis
Parastenia intervacatalis
Mecyna polygonalis gilvata
Psara pallidalis
Lonostege sulphuralis

Pterophoridae
Oxyptilus kollari
Oxyptilus pilosellae
Emmelina monodactylus
Leiptilus brachydactylus
Porrittia galactodactyla
Merrifieldia calcarius
Adaina microdactyla
Agdistis arabica
Agdistis nanodes
Agdistis tamaricis
Buckleria paludum
Cnaemidophorus rhododactyla
Gillmeria pallidactyla
Pterophorus pentadactyla
Wheeleria phlomidis
Megalorhipida leucodactylus

Carposinidae
Carposina ekbatana
Carposina roesleri
Carposina sasakii

Sesiidae
Dipsosphecia schwingenschussi
Dipsosphecia stiziformis
Bembecia ichneumoniformis
Pyropteron elampiformis
Pyropteron doryliformis inexpectata
Chamaesphecia consobrina
Chamaesphecia doryceraeformis
Chamaesphecia xantho
Chamaesphecia turbida
Chamaesphecia brandti
Chamaesphecia anthracias
Chamaesphecia modica
Chamaesphecia mirza
Chamaesphecia adelpha
Chamaesphecia fredi
Chamaesphecia leucocnemis
Chamaesphecia thomyris
Chamaesphecia palariformis nazir
Eusphecia pimplaeformis
Aegeria apiformis
Paranthrene tabaniformis
Synanthedon myopaeformis
Synanthedon cephiformis
Synanthedon conopiformis
Sesia leucopara
Sesia zimmermanni

Brachodidae
Brachodes appendiculata
Brachodes rhagensis
Brachodes formosa
Brachodes keredjella
Brachodes monotona 
Phycodes radiata
Brachodes diakona
Brachodes candefacta
Brachodes candefactus

Choreutidae
Tebenna bjerkandella
Prochoreuitis stellaris
Choreutis nemorana
Choreutis pariana
Hemerophila brandti

Tortricidae

Tortricinae

Cochylini
Phtheochroa aureopunctana (Ragonot, 1894)
Phtheochroa decipiens (Walsingham, 1900)
Phtheochroa durbonana (Lhomme, 1937)
Phtheochroa inopiana (Haworth, [1811])
Phtheochroa jerichoana (Amsel, 1935)
Phtheochroa kenneli (Obraztsov, 1944)
Phtheochroa pulvillana (Herrich-Schäffer, 1851)
Phtheochroa purissima (Osthelder, 1938)
Phtheochroa subfumida (Falkovitsh, 1963)
Phtheochroa syrtana Ragonot, 1888
Phtheochroa variolosana Christoph, 1887
Cochylimorpha alternana (Stephens, 1834)
Cochylimorpha armeniana (de Joannis, 1891)
Cochylimorpha asiana (Kennel, 1899)
Cochylimorpha brandti (Razowski, 1963)
Cochylimorpha diana (Kennel, 1899)
Cochylimorpha discolourana (Kennel, 1899)
Cochylimorpha eburneana (Kennel, 1899)
Cochylimorpha elegans (Razowski, 1963)
Cochylimorpha fluens (Razowski, 1970)
Cochylimorpha fucosa (Razowski, 1970)
Cochylimorpha halophilana adriatica Huemer, 2000
Cochylimorpha kurdistana (Amsel, 1959)
Cochylimorpha langeana (Kalchberg, 1897)
Cochylimorpha montana (Razowski, 1967)
Cochylimorpha nodulana (Möschler, 1862)
Cochylimorpha nomadana (Erschoff, 1874)
Cochylimorpha nuristana (Razowski, 1967)
Cochylimorpha pirizanica (Razowski, 1963)
Cochylimorpha scrophulana Razowski, 1963
Cochylimorpha simulata (Razowski, 1970)
Cochylimorpha straminea (Haworth, [1811])
Cochylimorpha wiltshirei (Razowski, 1963)
Phalonidia manniana (Fischer von Röslerstamm, 1839)
Gynnidomorpha permixtana ([Denis & Schiffermüller], 1775)
Agapeta hamana (Linnaeus, 1758)
Ceratoxanthis iberica Baixeras, 1992
Fulvoclysia forsteri Osthelder, 1938
Fulvoclysia rjabovi Kuznetzov, 1976
Fulvoclysia subdolana (Kennel, 1901)
Eugnosta lathoniana (Hübner, [1800])
Eugnosta magnificana (Rebel, 1914)
Aethes argyrospila Karisch, 2005
Aethes bilbaensis (Rössler, 1877)
Aethes conversana (Walsingham, 1908)
Aethes cremonana (Ragonot, 1894)
Aethes deutschiana (Zetterstedt, 1839)
Aethes eberti Sutter & Karisch, 2004
Aethes eichleri Razowski, 1983
Aethes fennicana (Hering, 1924)
Aethes flagellana atlasi Razowski, 1962
Aethes francillana (Fabricius, 1794)
Aethes iranica Razowski, 1963
Aethes kandovana Alipanah, 2009
Aethes kasyi Razowski, 1962
Aethes lateritia Razowski, 1970
Aethes luteopictana (Kennel, 1900)
Aethes margarotana (Duponchel, 1836)
Aethes moribundana (Staudinger, 1859)
Aethes pardaliana (Kennel, 1899)
Aethes persica Razowski, 1963
Aethes prangana (Kennel, 1900)
Aethes scalana (Zerny, 1927)
Aethes spirana (Kennel, 1899)
Aethes tesserana ([Denis & Schiffermüller], 1775)
Aethes williana (Brahm, 1791)
Aethes xanthina Falkowitsch, 1963
Cochylidia implicitana (Wocke, 1856)
Cochylidia moguntiana (Roessler, 1864)
Cochylidia rupicola (Curtis, 1834)
Diceratura ostrinana (Guenée, 1845)
Diceratura porrectana Djakonov, 1929
Diceratura roseofasciana (Mann, 1855)
Diceratura teheranica Razowski, 1970
Cochylis amoenana Kennel, 1899
Cochylis defessana Mann, 1861
Cochylis maestana Kennel, 1899
Cochylis piana (Kennel, 1919)
Cochylis posterana hyrcana (Toll, 1948)
Cochylis roseana (Haworth, [1811])
Cochylis similana Razowski, 1963

Tortricini
Aleimma loeflingiana (Linnaeus, 1758)
Tortrix viridana Linnaeus, 1758
Acleris napaea (Meyrick, 1912)
Acleris variegana ([Denis & Schiffermüller], 1775)
Acleris rhombana ([Denis & Schiffermüller], 1775)
Acleris quercinana (Zeller, 1849)
Acleris sparsana ([Denis & Schiffermüller], 1775)
Acleris lacordairana caucasica Filipjev, 1962
Acleris lorquiniana (Duponchel, 1835)
Acleris forsskaleana (Linnaeus, 1758)
Acleris hastiana (Linnaeus, 1758)

Archipini
Archips xylosteana (Linnaeus, 1758)
Archips rosana (Linnaeus, 1758)
Archips podana (Scopoli, 1763)
Archips philippa (Meyrick, 1918)
Archips crataegana (Hübner, [1799])
Choristoneura lafauryana (Ragonot, 1875)
Choristoneura hebenstreitella (Müller, 1764)
Argyrotaenia ljungiana (Thunberg, 1799)
Ptycholoma erschoffi Christoph, 1877
Pandemis chondrillana (Herrich-Schäffer, 1860)
Pandemis cerasana (Hübner, 1786)
Pandemis dumetana (Treitschke, 1835)
Pandemis heparana ([Denis & Schiffermüller], 1775)
Pandemis corylana (Fabricius, 1794)
Aphelia christophi Obraztsov, 1955
Aphelia peramplana (Hübner, [1825])
Aphelia ochreana (Hübner, [1796-1799])
Aphelia consica Razowski, 1981
Aphelia viburnana ([Denis & Schiffermüller], 1775)
Clepsis pallidana (Fabricius, 1776)
Clepsis rurinana (Linnaeus, 1758)
Clepsis consimilana (Hübner, 1817)

Other tribes
Sparganothis pilleriana
Cnephasia chrysantheana
Phatheochra schreibersiana
Laspeyresia molesta
Laspeyresia fagiglandana
Rhyacionia buoliana
Argyroploce vandarbana

Olethreutinae
Olethreutes lacunanus
Celphya cepitana
Celphya flavipalpana
Notocelia uddmanniana
Bactra furfurana
Bactra lancealana
Eucosma obumbrata
Epiblema graphanum
Epiblema cirsianum
Cydia funebrana
Cydia caecana
Cydia succedana
Cydia cosmophorana
Cydia duplicana
Cydia pomonella
Laspeyresia persicana
Thiodia trochillana
Epinotia granitana
Ancylis obtusana
Ancylis tineana
Ancylis curvana
Gypsonoma aceriana
Gypsonoma euphraticana
Gypsonoma hapalosarca
Lobesia botrana
Enarmonia formosana
Rhopobota naevana

Cossidae
Cossus cossus
Cossus irani
Cossus freidun
Cossus araraticus
Cossulinus herzi
Catopta kendevanensis
Dyspessa bipunctata
Dyspessa ulula pallida
Dyspessa emilia
Dyspessa kabylaria
Dyspessa serica
Dyspessa minima
Dyspessa tristis
Dyspessa bipunctata
Dyspessa foeda
Dyspessacossus fereidun
Hypopta lignosus
Phragmataecia territa
Phragmatoecia castaneae
Zeuzera regia 
Zeuzera pyrina
Holococerus gloriosus
Aethalopteryx diksami
Azygophleps larseni
Meharia acuta
Meharia hackeri
Meharia yakovlevi
Mormogystia brandstetteri
Mormogystia proleuca
Azygophleps regia
Azygophleps sheikh
Cecryphalus nubila
Cossulus argentatus
Cossulus lignosus
Cossulus mucosus
Cossulus putridus
Cossulus strioliger
Cossulus zoroastres
Deserticossus arenicola
Dieida ledereri
Dieida persa
Dyspessa agilis
Dyspessa albosignata
Dyspessa alipanahae
Dyspessa ariadne
Dyspessa elbursensis
Dyspessa pallidata
Dyspessa wagneri
Dyspessa zurvan
Dyspessacossus funkei

Oecophoridae
Ethmia cirrhocnemia
Ethmia alba
Ethmia quadrinotella
Ethmia vittalbella
Ethmia lecmima
Ethmia dodecea
Ethmia candidella
Ethmia aurifluella
Ethmia bipunctella
Ethmia iranella
Ethmia caradjae
Ethmia derbendella
Ethmia amasina
Ethmia tripunctella
Ethmia distigmatella
Ethmia duodecia
Depressaria purpurea
Depressaria ruticola
Depressaria mesopotamica
Depressaria discipunctella
Pleurota pyropella
Pleurota metricella
Pleurota wiltshirei
Symmoca costobscurella
Apiletria purulentella
Pseudamelia flavifrontella
Oecophora mannii
Oegoconia quadripuncta

Coleophoridae
Coleophora vibicigerella
Coleophora phlomidella
Coleophora ulmi
Coleophora badiipennella
Coleophora anatipenella
Coleophora pennella
Coleophora adjunctella
Coleophora caespititiella
Coleophora tamesis
Coleophora glaucicolella
Coleophora alticolella
Coleophora taeniipennella
Coleophora vestianella
Coleophora galbulipennella
Coleophora silenella
Coleophora salicorniae
Coleophora onopordiella
Carpochena aequalella
Carpochena teheranella
Coleophora lebedella
Coleophora botaurella
Chnoocera lasiocharis
Chnoocera magnatella
Coleophora abbasella
Coleophora adlecta
Coleophora aegyptiacae
Coleophora aervae
Coleophora albidorsella
Coleophora albiochrella
Coleophora amasiella
Coleophora arachnias
Coleophora arenbergi
Coleophora bedella
Coleophora bitlisella
Coleophora bivittella
Coleophora botaurella
Coleophora coronillae
Coleophora cratipennella
Coleophora decoratella
Coleophora discomaculella
Coleophora eilatica
Coleophora flabelligerella
Coleophora fulgidella
Coleophora gedrosiae
Coleophora gymnocarpella
Coleophora haoma
Coleophora hatamae
Coleophora hospitiella
Coleophora iranella
Coleophora jerusalemella
Coleophora kandevanella
Coleophora longiductella
Coleophora menephilella
Coleophora namakella
Coleophora niphomesta
Coleophora niveopictella
Coleophora nurmahal
Coleophora nutantella
Coleophora pallidata
Coleophora paragiraudi
Coleophora parcella
Coleophora parthica
Coleophora pauperculella
Coleophora phlomidella
Coleophora phlomidis
Coleophora qulikushella
Coleophora schahkuhensis
Coleophora schauffeleella
Coleophora sogdianae

Cosmopterigidae
Alloclita delozona
Alloclita gambiella
Ascalenia acaciella Chretien, 1915
Ascalenia callynella Kasy, 1968
Ascalenia echidnias Meyrick, 1891
Ascalenia imbella Kasy, 1975
Ascalenia kairaella Kasy, 1970
Ascalenia sirjanella Kasy, 1975
Batrachedra amydraula
Bifascia nigralbella (Chretien, 1915)
Bifascioides leucomelanellus (Rebel, 1917)
Bifascioides yemenellus (Amsel, 1961)
Calycobathra sahidanella Kasy, 1968
Eteobalea sumptuosella
Pseudascalenia abbasella Kasy, 1975
Pyroderces argyrogrammos
Anatrachyntis simplex
Ascalenia heterosticta
Ascalenia vanelloides
Ascalenia viviparella
Bifascioides pirastica
Calycobathra calligoni
Calycobathra variapenella
Gisilia lerautella
Pyroderces hemizopha

Scythrididae
Scythris emichi
Scythris flabella
Scythris satyrella
Scythris curlettii
Scythris senecai
Scythris ethmiella
Scythris decrepidella
Scythris friedeli
Scythris camelella
Scythris monochreella
Catascythris kebirella
Eretmocera medinella
Syringopais temperatella

Gelechiidae
Chrysoesthia drurella
Ergatis subericinella
Ergatis decurtella
Isophrictis striatella
Ceuthomadarus tenebrionellus
Metanarsia modesta
Psecadia pusiella
Psecadia bipunctella
Recurvaria nanella
Nothris verbascella
Anarsia lineatella
Gelechia pistaciae
Gelechia astragali
Syncopacma polychromella
Telphusa pistaciae
Cecidophaga sinaica
Vladimirea zygophyllivorella
Pectinophora gossypiella
Pectinophora malvella
Recurvaria pistaciicola
Phtorimaea operculella
Sitotroga cerealella
Ornativalva antipyramis

Yponomeutidae
Yponomeuta malinellus
Yponomeuta padellus
Yponomeuta rorellus

Ypsolophidae
Ypsolopha seniculella 
Ypsolopha ephedrella
Ypsolopha sculpturella

Plutellidae
Plutella xylostella

Glyphipterygidae
Simaethis nemorana
Anthophila pariana

Heliodinidae
Heliodines roesella

Lyonetiidae
Leucoptera malifoliella
Lyonetia clerkella

Bucculatricidae
Bucculatrix endospiralis
Bucculatrix iranica 
Bucculatrix pectinella
Bucculatrix ulmella
Bucculatrix ulmifoliae

Psychidae
Oiketicus quadrangularis
Apterona crenulellu
Apterona helix
Amictoides shahkuhensis
Amicta villosa
Urobarba longicauda
Melasina aequalis

Tineidae
Euplocamus bienerti
Euplocamus schaeferi
Morophagoides iranensis
Nemapogon granellus
Nemapogon signatellus
Nemapogon orientalis
Neurothaumasia inornata
Neurothaumasia fasciata
Obesoceras holtzi
Infurcitinea amseli
Infurcitinea fasciella
Infurcitinea obscuroides
Infurcitinea teheranensis
Infurcitinea iranensis
Infurcitinea megalopterella
Infurcitinea brunneopterella
Rhodobates pallipalpellus
Pachyarthra brandti
Pachyarthra grisea
Pachyarthra iranica
Myrmecozela lutosella gigantea
Myrmecozela lutosella centrogramma
Epsicardia caerulipennis
Epsicardia xerexes
Perissomastix flava
Perissomastix cornuta
Perissomastix wiltshirella
Perissomastix peterseni
Perissomastix palaestinella
Ateliotum petrinellum orientale
Ateliotum arabicum
Ateliotum syriacum
Ateliotum confusum
Cephimallota praetoriella
Ceratuncus affinitellus
Fermocelina iranica
Trichophaga abruptella
Trichophaga tapetzella
Tinea translucens
Tinea basifasciella
Tinea rostrata
Tinea nonimella
Tineola casandella
Tineola bisselliella
Tineola pellionella
Niditinea tugurialis
Niditinea piercella
Euplocamus bienerti
Niditinea fuscella
Proterospastis trimaculata
Ceratobia irakella
Hapsifera luridella
Eudorea mercurella
Haplotinea ditella
Haspifera asiatica

Gracilariidae
Acrocercops iraniana Triberti, 1990
Aspilapteryx magna Triberti, 1985
Aspilapteryx tringipennella (Zeller, 1839)
Caloptilia roscipennella (Hübner, 1796)
Calybites phasianipennella (Hübner, [1813])
Cupedia cupediella (Herrich-Schäffer, 1855)
Parornix persicella Danilevsky, 1955
Phyllocnistis citrella Stainton, 1856
Phyllonorycter blancardella (Fabricius, 1781)
Phyllonorycter corylifoliella (Hübner, 1796)
Phyllonorycter iranica Deschka, 1979
Phyllonorycter platani (Staudinger, 1870)
Phyllonorycter turanica (Gerasimov, 1931)
Polymitia eximipalpella (Gerasimov, 1930)
Polymitia laristana Triberti, 1986

Tischeriidae
Tischeria marginea

Heliozelidae
Holocacista rivillei

Adelidae
Nematopogon swammerdamellus
Adela croesella
Adela cuprella

Nepticulidae
Simplimorpha promissa

Hepialidae
Hepialus humuli

Alucitidae
Alucita cymatodactyla
Alucita iranensis
Alucita palodactyla
Alucita pseudohuebneri

Autostichidae
Apiletria purulentella
Heringita amseli
Mylothra forsteri
Mylothra mithra
Oegoconia quadripuncta
Symmoca costobscurella
Turatia iranica

Batrachedridae
Batrachedra amydraula

Crambidae
Aeschremon disparalis
Agriphila bleszynskiella
Agriphila cyrenaicellus
Agriphila microselasella
Agriphila tersellus
Agrotera nemoralis
Amselia heringi
Anania rudalis
Anania verbascalis
Anarpia incertalis
Ancylolomia bitubirosella
Ancylolomia disparalis
Ancylolomia micropalpella
Ancylolomia palpella
Ancylolomia pectinatella
Ancylolomia pectinatellus
Ancylolomia westwoodi
Aporodes floralis
Apyrausta persicalis
Asaluria reisseri
Botys dulcinalis
Botys tesserulalis
Calamotropha paludella
Calaniochrous acutellus
Catoptria emiliae
Catoptria incertellus
Catoptria kasyi
Catoptria pfeifferi
Catoptria siliciellus
Chilo luteellus
Chilo phragmitella
Chilo suppressalis
Chiloides hederalis
Chrysocrambus linetella

See also
List of butterflies of Iran

External links
The Heliothinae of Iran (Lepidoptera: Noctuidae)
, 2009: Synopsis of the Cochylini (Tortricidae: Tortricinae: Cochylini) of Iran, with the description of a new species. Zootaxa 2245: 1-31.
, 2009: A brief study on the tribes Tortricini and Archipini (Lepidoptera: Tortricinae) from Iran. Entomofauna Band 30, Heft 10: 137-152.
Walshiidae aus der Umgebung von Bandar-Abbas, Südiran (Lepidopt.)
Biological diversity of Lepidoptera in Iran

Moths

Moths
Iran
Iran
Iran